James Lennon may refer to:
 James Lennon (Irish politician), Irish Sinn Féin politician
 James Lennon (Wisconsin politician), member of the Wisconsin State Assembly
 James Lennon (bishop), Irish Catholic bishop
 James Wilfrid Lennon, Irish diplomat. 
 Jimmy Lennon, ring announcer for boxing and wrestling matches
 Jimmy Lennon Jr., American boxing ring announcer